Ernst Frick (1881–1956) was a Swiss painter.

References
This article was initially translated from the German Wikipedia.

20th-century Swiss painters
Swiss male painters
1881 births
1956 deaths
20th-century Swiss male artists